In Islamic philosophy, wahdat al-mawjud is the concept of the intrinsic unity of all created things. The concept can be viewed as analogous or related to pantheism insofar as it does not account for any separation between the divine and the material world.

Origin 
Some believe that wahdat al mawjud originates from Greek philosophy, such as Heraclitus' assertion that "God is day and night, winter and summer, many and little, solid and liquid."

Relation to wahdat al wujud 
It is sometimes viewed as the opposite of wahdat al-wujud, a concept which frames God as the only true reality, and the material universe as an illusion emanating from God. It is sometimes described as the concept that existence moves towards spiritual oneness, but remains plural. Under this understanding, human beings can become İnsan-ı Kâmil and attain the wisdom of God. 

Other, however, understand wahdat al wujud and wahdat al mawjud as identical.

Al Hallaj 
Some associate the concept with Mansur al Hallaj's statement "Ana al Haqq" (I am the Truth).

References 
A, Yaşar Ocak. (1992) Osmanli Imparatorluğunda Marjinal Sufilik: Kalenderiler (XIV-XVII yüzyillar). Ankara: TTK..

External links
http://www.hbvdergisi.gazi.edu.tr/index.php/TKHBVD/article/view/890
http://www.ukm.my/ijit/wp-content/uploads/2016/01/10-Yusri-Mohd-Ramli-IJIT-Vol-3-2013.pdf

Islamic philosophy
Islamic terminology